Agyneta alpica is a species of sheet weaver found in Austria and Switzerland. It was described by Tanasevitch in 2000.

References

alpica
Spiders described in 2000
Spiders of Europe